A SAML service provider is a system entity that receives and accepts authentication assertions in conjunction with a single sign-on (SSO) profile of the Security Assertion Markup Language (SAML).

In the SAML domain model, a SAML relying party is any system entity that receives and accepts information from another system entity. Of particular interest is a SAML relying party that receives and accepts a SAML assertion issued by a SAML authority.

An important type of SAML authority is the SAML identity provider, a system entity that issues authentication assertions in conjunction with an SSO profile of SAML. A relying party that consumes such assertions is called a SAML service provider (or simply service provider if the domain is understood). Thus a SAML service provider is a system entity that receives and accepts an authentication assertion issued by a SAML identity provider.

See also

 Security Assertion Markup Language (SAML)
 SAML identity provider
 SAML-based products and services

References

XML-based standards
Federated identity
Computer access control